Veettukku Vandha Marumagal is a 1973 Indian Tamil-language drama film directed by R. Vittal. The film stars A. V. M. Rajan and Latha. It was released on 3 September 1973.

Plot

Cast 
List adapted from the film credits

Male cast
 A. V. M. Rajan
 Ravichandran
 Cho
 Isari Velan
 Oru Viral Krishna Rao
 Karikol Raju
 Jeevagan
 Jayaraman
 Vijaya Rao
 Ratnakumar
 Master Rajkumar

Female cast
 Vennira Aadai Nirmala
 Latha
 G. Varalakshmi
 Manorama
 Tambaram Lalitha
 Achchachcho Chitra
 Shanmugasundari
 Kanthimathi
 K. S. Angamuthu
 Vijayakumari
 Vijayarani
 Burma Chandra
 Baby Indra

Guest artists
 R. Muthuraman
 Thengai Seenivasan
 V. S. Raghavan
 M. N. Rajam

Production 
The film was produced under the banner Sri Navaneedha Films by G. Subramania Reddiar who also wrote the story. R. Vittal directed the film. This is his debut as a director.  A. L. Narayanan and S. Aiyapillai wrote the screenplay and Dialogues. Pl. Nagappa was in charge of Cinematography while the Operative Cameraman was N. K. Visvanathan and editing was done by N. Damodharan. Art director was A. Balu and the choreography was done by A. K. Chopra and Chinni – Sampath duo. Still photography was handled by Chimmaiah and Anand. The film was shot at AVM, Bharani and Katpagam studios and processing was done at Vijaya Laboratory.

Soundtrack 
Music was composed by Shankar–Ganesh while the lyrics were penned by Kannadasan. Playback singers are T. M. Soundararajan, P.Susheela, A. M. Rajah, Vani Jairam, who made her debut in Tamil Films, Jikki and L. R. Eswari.

References

External links 
 

1970s Tamil-language films
1973 drama films
1973 films
Films scored by Shankar–Ganesh
Indian drama films